Qiao Zhenyu (born 1 November 1978) is a Chinese actor who is a graduate of the Beijing Dance Academy.

Career
In 2000, Qiao made his debut in the film Soaring Dragon Leaping Tiger. The same year, he filmed his first television drama Xin Nü Fu Ma.

In 2006, he starred in several hit dramas namely Princess Shengping, Love of Fate and Fast Track Love, which won him recognition.
He received the Best New Actor award at the TVS Award Ceremony.

In 2007, he starred in The Spirit of the Sword, based on the novel of the same name by Gu Long. The drama was a ratings hit and propelled Qiao to fame in China. He also starred in several well received historical dramas like Seven Swords (2006) and The Book and the Sword (2008).

In 2013, he starred in the critically acclaimed family drama To Elderly with Love. The same year, he starred in the critically acclaimed historical drama Heroes of Sui and Tang Dynasties, as well as period drama Beauties at the Crossfire. He received recognition for his acting performance, and won the Most Popular Actor award at the Shanghai Television Festival.

In 2014, he starred in the hit fantasy action drama Swords of Legends and received popularity for his portrayal of the anti-hero, Ouyang Shaogong.

In 2017, he starred in the historical drama Song of Phoenix, portraying King Huai of Chu. He received the Outstanding Performance award at the inaugural Gold Hibiscus Awards.

In 2019, Qiao starred in the mystery web drama Mystery of Antiques.

In 2019, Qiao starred in the historical drama Empress of the Ming.

Filmography

Film

Television series

References

External links
 

1978 births
Living people
Male actors from Guangxi
Chinese male dancers
People from Guilin
Chinese male film actors
Chinese male television actors
21st-century Chinese male actors
Beijing Film Academy alumni